The Settimana Ciclistica Italiana is a professional bicycle road race held through out Italy. Its first edition took place in July 2021, as part of the UCI Europe Tour as a 2.1 category event. The race normally runs over five days over hilly terrain.

Overall Winners

Classifications
As of the 2021 edition, the jerseys worn by the leaders of the individual classifications are:
 - Blue Jersey  – The Blue Jersey is worn by the leader of the overall classification. 
 - White Jersey  – The White Jersey is worn by the leader of the overall Points classification.
 - Orange Jersey – Worn by the best rider under 23 years of age on the overall classification as leader of the Young rider classification. 
 - Green Jersey – The Green Jersey is worn by the leader of the overall Mountains classification.

References

External Links
 

Cycle races in Italy
UCI Europe Tour races
2021 establishments in Italy